Colonel Donald Macdonald (born 1624) was a Scottish soldier.

He was born the son of Sir Donald Gorme Macdonald, 8th Laird of Sleat, and 1st Baronet, and his wife Janet. A distinguished soldier who commanded the Clan Uisdein contingent at the battle of Killiecrankie, he obtained, either by tack or wadset, the lands of Castleton, Knock, Totamurich, and Camuscross, and of these he obtained a new wadset from his brother, Sir James Mor Macdonald, 2nd Baronet, in 1665. 

He likewise held the lands of Ord, Croswaig, Tockvaig, and Tarsgavaig, also in the barony of Sleat. In 1691, he appears on the
Valuation Roll of Inverness as a landowner in the county.

Marriage and children
He married Margaret, daughter of John Cameron of Lochiel, and was succeeded by his son Ranald.

References

Scottish soldiers
Colonels (military rank)
Younger sons of baronets
1624 births
Year of death missing